Lepidiota stigma, also known as sugarcane white grub, is a species of insect native to Southeast Asia. The species is known to attack sugarcane fields in the region.

References

Beetles of Asia
Pests (organism)
Articles with 'species' microformats
Melolonthinae